Senator Hillyer may refer to:

Charles T. Hillyer (1800–1891), Connecticut State Senate
George Hillyer (1835–1927), Georgia State Senate

See also
 Hillyer (disambiguation)